Yelena Kurzina (born November 28, 1960) is a Belarusian slalom canoer who competed in the 1990s. She finished 25th in the K-1 event at the 1996 Summer Olympics in Atlanta.

References
Sports-Reference.com profile

1960 births
Belarusian female canoeists
Canoeists at the 1996 Summer Olympics
Living people
Olympic canoeists of Belarus
Place of birth missing (living people)
20th-century Belarusian women